Linköping University (LiU) is a public research university based in Linköping, Sweden. Originally established in 1969, it was granted full university status in 1975 and is one of Sweden's largest academic institutions. The university has four campuses across three cities: Campus Valla and Campus US in Linköping, Campus Norrköping in Norrköping and Campus Lidingö in Stockholm. It is organized into four faculties: Arts and Sciences, Medicine and Health Sciences, Educational Sciences, and the Institute of Technology. In order to facilitate interdisciplinary work, there are 12 large departments combining knowledge from several disciplines and often belonging under more than one faculty. Linköping University emphasises dialogue with the surrounding business sphere and the community at large, both in terms of research and education. In 2021 the university was home to 35,900 students and 4,300 employees. 
It is a member of the European Consortium of Innovative Universities, as well as a founding member of the Conceive Design Implement Operate Initiative.

History

The origins of Linköping University date back to the 1960s. In 1965, The Swedish National Legislative Assembly (Riksdag) decided to locate some programmes within the fields of technology and medicine to Linköping. In 1967 a branch of Stockholm University was placed in Linköping, offering education within humanities, social sciences and natural sciences. Two years later in 1969, a unit for medical training and the Institute of Technology were established, marking the founding of the university. In 1970 all activities were brought together in three faculties within the Linköping University College: the Faculty of Arts and Sciences, the Faculty of Medicine and the Institute of Technology. Linköping University College was granted full university status in 1975 and renamed Linköping University.

In 1977 the teacher training colleges in Linköping and Norrköping were transferred to Linköping University. The Faculty of Health Sciences was formed in 1986 based on the faculty of medicine and regional funded education in health care professions. In 1997 a campus was opened in the neighbouring city of Norrköping. The renowned Carl Malmsten School of Furniture (Malmstens Linköping University) has been part of Linköping University since 2000. After almost 60 years at the city centre, the school moved into new premises on the outskirts of Stockholm in 2009.

Campuses

Education and research are conducted at three campuses in the cities of Linköping and Norrköping — Campus Valla, Campus US and Campus Norrköping — situated approximately 200 and 160 kilometers southwest of Stockholm, respectively. The Campus Bus (free of charge for students) connects the three campuses in Linköping and Norrköping. A fourth campus, Campus Lidingö, is located in Lidingö, an island in the inner Stockholm archipelago.

Campus Valla

Campus Valla, three kilometers from the city centre of Linköping, is the university's largest campus and where the majority of students and researchers study and work. Campus Valla is sandwiched between Linköping Science Park and Linköping Golf Course to the west, and Valla Wood — a 200 acres large nature reserve — to the east.

Campus US

Campus US (the University Hospital campus) in Linköping houses the Faculty of Medicine and Health Sciences. Campus US is located next to Linköping University Hospital and Linköping City Park (The Garden Society), and only a few hundred meters from the city centre.

Campus Norrköping

Campus Norrköping is a city campus in central Norrköping, 40 kilometers northeast of Linköping. Approximately one-fourth of the students are enrolled here. The campus is located in the historical Industrilandskapet district, with campus buildings on both sides of the river Motala ström connected by Campusbron, a footbridge.

Campus Lidingö

Campus Lidingö houses the Carl Malmsten School of Furniture (Malmstens Linköping University), which has been part of Linköping University since 2000. After almost 60 years at the city centre, the school moved into new premises in Lidingö, on the outskirts of Stockholm in 2009.

Organization and administration

Faculties
 
Linköping University is organized in four faculties:

 Faculty of Arts and Sciences
 Faculty of Science and Engineering (also referred to as the Institute of Technology)
 Faculty of Medicine and Health Sciences and Linköping University Hospital
 Faculty of Educational Sciences

Departments

There are 12 large departments — in turn organized in divisions (not listed below) — intersecting several disciplines and often belonging under more than one faculty:

 Department of Behavioural Sciences and Learning
 Department of Biomedical and Clinical Sciences
 Department of Computer and Information Science
 Department of Management and Engineering
 Department of Physics, Chemistry and Biology
 Department of Health, Medicine and Caring Sciences
 Department of Culture and Society
 Department of Biomedical Engineering
 Department of Electrical Engineering
 Department of Science and Technology
 Department of Thematic Studies
 Department of Mathematics

Academics

Education

Linköping University offers education at the basic and advanced levels via 120 study programmes, 550 single-subject courses and specialised as well as interdisciplinary postgraduate studies. 
A large number of the degree programmes lead to qualified professional degrees in fields such as medicine, business and economics, teacher education and engineering. Many of the programmes are interdisciplinary, combining for example industrial management and engineering, medicine and engineering, or integrating economics, law and languages.

In 1986 the Faculty of Medicine and Health Sciences became the first faculty in Sweden to put problem-based learning into practice within medical training and health-care programmes. 

In 2000, Massachusetts Institute of Technology in collaboration with three Swedish universities — Linköping University, Chalmers University of Technology and the Royal Institute of Technology — formally founded the  Conceive Design Implement Operate (CDIO) Initiative, a framework for engineering education. 
CDIO developed into an international collaboration, with universities around the world adopting the same framework.

In 2007, the Medical Programme and the Department of Electrical Engineering, Control systems were recognized as Centres of Excellence in Higher Education by the Swedish National Agency for Higher Education. Linköping University was awarded 2 out of the 8 Centres of Excellence recognized at Swedish universities, with the recognition based on a thorough quality assessment by a panel of experts.

Research

Linköping University pursues research and postgraduate studies within the fields of technology, medicine, and humanities, natural, educational, social and behavioural sciences. It is particularly noted for its openness to multidisciplinary research and, in 1980, was the first Swedish university to introduce interdisciplinary thematic research at the Faculty of Arts and Sciences, and a cross-subject, interdisciplinary perspective in graduate schools for PhD students.

Linköping University receives research grants from the Swedish government within five strategic research areas: IT and mobile communication, materials science, security and emergency management, e-Science and transport research.

Research centres

 Control, Autonomy, and Decision-making in Complex Systems (Linnaeus Centre CADICS)
 Gender Excellence (GEXcel), The Swedish Research Council Centre of
 Hearing and Deafness (Linnaeus Centre HEAD), Research on
 The National Supercomputer Centre, a provider of national supercomputing resources
 Novel Functional Materials (Linnécentrum LiLI-NFM), Linköping Linnaeus Initiative for
 Organic Bioelektronics (OBOE), Strategic Research Centre for
 Norrköping Visualization Center C, in cooperation with the City of Norrköping and Norrköping Science Park and Interactive Institute. The Dome Theatre, constructed in 2009, is the most technically advanced dome in northern Europe.
 The Center for Disaster Medicine and Traumatology (KMC). A National Research Center for Traumatology assigned by the Swedish National Board of Health and Welfare.

For a complete list of centres, see Organisation

Rankings

Linköping University has a strong emphasis on engineering and technology, and in the 2022 ARWU ranking it places in the top 100 in the following engineering subjects:
Telecommunication Engineering 51-75,
Electrical & Electronic Engineering 76-100, 
Materials Science & Engineering 76-100, 
Nanoscience & Nanotechnology 76-100 and
Energy Science & Engineering 76-100.

In the 2022 THE ranking, Linköping University places in the top 125 in the following broad categories: 
Engineering & Technology 101-125,
Business & Economics 101-125 and 
Psychology 101-125. 
In addition, it places in the top 200 in:
Computer Science 151-175 and
Social Sciences 176-200.

Linköping University Hospital places 176 in Newsweek's 2023 World's Best Hospitals ranking (5th in Sweden).

In the TOP500 ranking of the world's supercomputers, as of June 2022, Sweden's two fastest supercomputers are at Linköping University's National Supercomputer Centre: 
 Berzelius in place 102 (specialized for machine learning and artificial intelligence)
 Tetralith in place 183

Science parks

Two science parks — Linköping Science Park and Norrköping Science Park — are closely connected to Linköping University.

Linköping Science Park

Linköping Science Park Mjärdevi Science Park in Linköping hosts 350 technology companies, from start-ups to multinationals, with 6,500 employees (2017). The largest residents of Mjärdevi are Ericsson, IFS and Infor. Major multinationals such as ARRIS Group, Flextronics, Autoliv and Toyota Industries are also represented.

Norrköping Science Park

Norrköping Science Park in Norrköping hosts approximately 130 companies. Main areas for research and development are printed electronics, interactivity and visualisation.

Notable people

Faculty

Gerhard Andersson, professor of clinical psychology
Anders Blomqvist, professor of pain research
Christian Berggren, professor of industrial management
Magnus Berggren, professor of organic electronics
Per-Erik Ellström, professor of education
Fredrik Gustafsson, professor of sensor informatics
Lars Hultman, professor of materials science
Olle Inganäs, professor of organic electronics
Lennart Ljung, professor of control theory
Nina Lykke, professor of gender studies
Jan-Ove Palmberg, professor of mechanical engineering
Jerker Rönnberg, professor of psychology
Carl-Ulrik Schierup, professor of ethnicity
Stefan Thor, professor of biology
Anthony Turner, professor of biosensors and bioelectronics

Former faculty

Stig Hagström, professor emeritus of materials science
One of the founders of Linköping University
Leading researcher in materials science
Harold Lawson, former professor of telecommunications and computer systems
Credited with the invention of the pointer in programming languages
ACM Fellow
Ingemar Lundström, professor emeritus of applied physics
Leading researcher in biosensors and chemical sensors
Chairman for the Nobel Committee for Physics
Hans Rådström, former professor of applied mathematics
Mathematician who made many important contributions
Erik Sandewall, professor emeritus of computer science
Leading researcher in artificial intelligence
AAAI Fellow
Vladimir Mazya, professor emeritus of mathematics
Known for his work on Sobolev spaces
Åke Öberg, professor emeritus of biomedical engineering
Leading researcher in circulatory physiology, bio-optics, biomedical instrumentation, sensors and clinical engineering

Alumni

Carl-Henric Svanberg, chairman of Volvo, former CEO of Ericsson and chairman of BP
Henry Radamson, Swedish professor of microelectronics and semiconductor, member of Chinese Academy of Science
Anders Flodström, professor of materials physics at the Royal Institute of Technology, former rector of the Royal Institute of Technology, former university chancellor of Sweden and head of the Swedish National Agency for Higher Education
Gustav Fridolin, former minister for education in the Government of Sweden
Therése Sjömander Magnusson, head of the Nordic Africa Institute
Jan Malm, former CEO, Ericsson China, 2000–2004
Jan-Eric Sundgren, former rector of Chalmers Institute of Technology, now senior vice president, Volvo Group
Ola Tunander, former research professor at the Peace Research Institute Oslo
Åke Svensson, director general of Teknikföretagen (employers' organisation for engineering companies), former president and CEO Saab AB
Björn von Sydow, former Speaker of the Riksdag and Minister for Defence 1997–2002
Cecilia Widegren, member of the Riksdag and vice chairman in The Parliamentary Defense Committee and Group
Zhong Zhihua, rector of Tongji University, member of the Chinese Academy of Engineering
Bertil Andersson, former president of Nanyang Technological University
Stefan Thor, Member of the Royal Swedish Academy of Sciences and Professor of Developmental Biology at the University of Queensland, Brisbane, Australia

See also

List of universities in Sweden
Lysator, the oldest computer society in Sweden. Founded in 1973.

Notes

External links 

 Linköping University - Official site in English
 Campuses at LiU
 Visualization Center C
 

 
Universities in Sweden
Buildings and structures in Linköping
Educational institutions established in 1975
1975 establishments in Sweden